Recycled Life is a 2006 American short documentary film directed by Leslie Iwerks. It relays the story of a massive toxic landfill near Guatemala City, and the local residents who scavenge there to eke out their meager living. It was nominated for an Academy Award for Best Documentary Short.

References

External links

2006 films
2006 short documentary films
2006 independent films
American short documentary films
American independent films
Films directed by Leslie Iwerks
Documentary films about poverty
2000s English-language films
2000s American films